Eupithecia rubigata is a moth in the family Geometridae. It is found in Bolivia.

References

Moths described in 1874
rubigata
Moths of South America